Sphegina  lobata  (Loew 1863), the Yellow-lobed Pufftail, is an uncommon species of syrphid fly observed in notheastern North America. Hoverflies can remain nearly motionless in flight. The adults are also known as flower flies for they are commonly found on flowers, from which they get both energy-giving nectar and protein-rich pollen. Larvae found in accumulations of decaying sap under bark, usually in wet situations such as damp, shaded woodland and in partially submerged wood in streams and pools.

Distribution
Canada, United States

References

Eristalinae
Insects described in 1863
Diptera of North America
Taxa named by Hermann Loew